Seo Hui-yeop (born 29 February 1992) is a South Korean  weightlifter. He is the 2015 Asian champion.

Career
He competed in the men's 105 kg event at the 2015 Asian Weightlifting Championships where he won a gold medal.  At the 2017 Asian Weightlifting Championships he won the silver medal in the 105 kg category.

Major results

References

External links
 

1992 births
Living people
South Korean male weightlifters
Weightlifters at the 2018 Asian Games
Asian Games competitors for South Korea
20th-century South Korean people
21st-century South Korean people